Abraliopsis gilchristi is a species of enoploteuthid cephalopods found in southern temperate waters of the south Pacific Ocean, from New Zealand to South Africa, where it is abundant. It undergoes a vertical daily migration spending the day at depth and moving closer to the surface at night to feed on copepods, euphausiids and hyperiids. Spawning appears to occur between September and December. The specific name honours the Scottish zoologist John Gilchrist (1866-1926) who was the first director of the Marine Biological Survey in Cape Town. The type specimen was taken off Cape Town and is held in the Natural History Museum, London.

References

Abraliopsis
Molluscs described in 1924